House of Assembly elections were held in Tobago on 17 January 2005 to elect the twelve members of the Tobago House of Assembly. The Tobago Council of the People's National Movement won 11 seats with 58.02% of the vote, while the Democratic Action Congress won one seat with 40.41% of the vote.

Results

References

Tobago
Local elections in Trinidad and Tobago
2005 in Trinidad and Tobago